
Year 786 (DCCLXXXVI) was a common year starting on Sunday  of the Julian calendar. The denomination 786 for this year has been used since the early medieval period, when the Anno Domini calendar era became the prevalent method in Europe for naming years.

Events 
 By place 

 Europe 
 King Charles the Younger, son of Charlemagne and ruler of Aquitaine, visits Monte Cassino and Capua, both in Beneventan territory. Prince Arechis II, feeling threatened by the Franks, decides that he needs to stop quarrelling with the Byzantine Duchy of Naples so he can focus on the Frankish foe. Prince Arechis II therefore signs a peace agreement, or 'pactum', with the Duchy of Naples. 

 Britain 
 Cyneheard, brother of the late king Sigeberht, ambushes and kills his rival Cynewulf of Wessex, while he is at Meretun (now called Marten) with his mistress. The Wessex nobles refuse to recognise Cyneheard as king. 
 Cyneheard is executed and succeeded by Beorhtric, through the support of King Offa of Mercia. His rival claimant to the Wessex throne, a distant nephew of the late king Ine, named Egbert, is driven across the Channel.
 Egbert settles at the court of Charlemagne, and learns the arts of government during his time in Gaul. During his stay he meets Eadberht, a priest, who later becomes king of Kent.

 Abbasid Caliphate 
 June 11 – Battle of Fakhkh: An Alid uprising in Medina is crushed by the Abbasids. One of the Alids, Idris ibn Abdallah, flees to the Maghreb in western North Africa, where he later founds the Idrisid dynasty in 788/789.
 September 14 – Harun al-Rashid becomes the Abbasid caliph in Baghdad, upon the death of his brother Al-Hadi. He appoints Salim Yunisi as governor of Sindh and the Indus Valley.

 By topic 

 Religion 
 Beatus of Liébana, monk and theologian, publishes his Commentary on the Apocalypse.

Births 
 October 10 – Saga, emperor of Japan (d. 842)
 Adelochus, archbishop of Strasbourg (d. 823)
 Al-Ḥajjāj ibn Yūsuf ibn Maṭar, Muslim mathematician (d. 833)
 Al-Ma'mun, Muslim caliph (d. 833)
 Sahl ibn Bishr, Muslim astrologer (approximate date)
 Tachibana no Kachiko, empress of Japan (d. 850)

Deaths 
 June 11 – Al-Husayn ibn Ali al-Abid, anti-Abbasid rebel leader
 September 14 – Al-Hadi, Muslim caliph (b. 764)
 September – Marajil, mother of caliph al-Ma'mun.
 October 16 – Lullus, archbishop of Mainz
 Abo of Tiflis, Christian martyr
 Al-Rabi' ibn Yunus, Muslim minister (or 785)
 Cyneheard the Ætheling, nobleman of Wessex
 Cynewulf, king of Wessex
 Desiderius, king of the Lombards (approximate date)
 Diarmait mac Conaing, king of South Brega (Ireland)
 Sakanoue no Karitamaro, Japanese general (b. 727)
 Tipraiti mac Taidg, king of Connacht (Ireland)
 Empress Wang (Dezong) of China

References